The 1939–40 Sussex County Football League season was the 20th in the history of the competition.

Due to the Second World War, a war-time emergency competition was announced and 16 teams were placed into two separate leagues, 8 teams in the Eastern Division and 8 in the Western Division. With the winners of each league playing in a play-off to decide the overall winner.

Clubs
The league featured 16 clubs, 14 which competed in the last season, along with two new clubs:
 Hastings & St Leonards
 Eastbourne

Eastern Division

League table

Western Division

League table

Play-off Final

Worthing 1 — 0 Hastings & St Leonards 
Source= Sussex County league - Historic League Tables

References

1945-46
9